Blake Smith (born January 17, 1991) is an American former professional soccer player.

Professional career

Montreal Impact
On January 17, 2013, Smith was selected 8th overall in the 2013 MLS SuperDraft by the Montreal Impact. On February 25, 2013, the Impact officially signed Smith. He made his professional debut on March 30, 2013, against Sporting Kansas City, coming on as a sub in the 79th minute for Marco Di Vaio. On May 13, the Impact loaned Smith to NASL club Indy Eleven.

Smith was waived by Montreal on May 7, 2015. Smith played the remainder of 2015 with Swiss club Yverdon Sport FC before being signed on December 15, 2015, by NASL expansion club Miami FC.

FC Cincinnati
On February 5, 2018, Smith signed with United Soccer League side FC Cincinnati.

After Cincinnati moved to Major League Soccer the following season, Smith re-signed with the club on December 10, 2018. After appearing on the bench for FC Cincinnati in their MLS league debut, he was placed on waivers by the club on March 7, 2019.

Loan to Pacific FC
On April 8, 2019, Smith was loaned to Canadian Premier League side Pacific FC. Smith was part of Pacific FC in their first-ever season, as well as the first season in league history. Smith contributed with five assists, tied with five other players for the most in the league.

San Antonio FC
On December 23, 2019, Smith joined San Antonio FC, returning to his hometown as a native of nearby Boerne, Texas.

At the end of the season, Smith announced his retirement from playing professional soccer.

Career statistics

Honors
Montreal Impact
Canadian Championship (2): 2013, 2014
CONCACAF Champions League runner-up (1): 2014-15

References

External links
 
 

1991 births
Living people
Association football midfielders
American soccer players
Soccer players from El Paso, Texas
People from Boerne, Texas
American expatriate soccer players
Expatriate soccer players in Canada
American expatriate sportspeople in Canada
Expatriate footballers in Switzerland
American expatriate sportspeople in Switzerland
New Mexico Lobos men's soccer players
Austin Aztex players
CF Montréal draft picks
CF Montréal players
Indy Eleven players
Yverdon-Sport FC players
Miami FC players
FC Cincinnati (2016–18) players
FC Cincinnati players
Pacific FC players
San Antonio FC players
USL League Two players
Major League Soccer players
North American Soccer League players
USL Championship players
Canadian Premier League players